There is a list of universities, colleges and schools in the city of Comilla, Bangladesh.

Universities

Medical colleges

University colleges

Law colleges

These are law colleges situated in Comilla.

Colleges
List of best government College 
1.cumilla victoria Government College 
2.Cumilla Government College 
3.cumilla Government Women's College 
4.Cumilla Government City College 
5.Cumilla sikkha Board govt.Model College 
6.Lalmay Government College 
7.Nawab foijunnesa Govt College, laksam

List of privet College 
1.Ispahani Public school & College 
2.Sonar Bangla College 
3.Ibn Tymia School and College 
4.Ruposhi Bangla College 
5.Cumilla Ajit guhu Moha biddyaloi
6.Cumilla Commerce College 
7.Cumilla Cantonment College 
8.Cumilla biggan(science College) 
9.cumilla City College 
10. Cumilla cambbrian College

Schools

These are schools situated in Comilla.

Others

See also

 Education in Bangladesh
 List of educational institutions in Barisal
 List of educational institutions in Khulna
 List of educational institutions in Sylhet

References

Universities and schools in Comilla
Comilla
Education in Cumilla